Lucas Mika Wolf (born 28 August 2001) is a German professional footballer who plays as a midfielder for  club Holstein Kiel.

Career
Wolf made his senior debut with VfB Lübeck as a substitute in a 1–1 draw at home to 1. FC Saarbrücken on 19 September 2020.

In May 2022, he made his 2. Bundesliga with Holstein Kiel in a 3–0 win against 1. FC Nürnberg. Also in May he signed his first professional contract which tied him to the club until June 2024.

References

External links
 
 

2001 births
Living people
German footballers
People from Eckernförde
Footballers from Schleswig-Holstein
Association football midfielders
VfB Lübeck players
Holstein Kiel players
Holstein Kiel II players
2. Bundesliga players
3. Liga players
Regionalliga players
Oberliga (football) players